Gisèle Ben-Dor ( Buka; born 26 April 1955) is an American Israeli orchestra conductor of Uruguayan origin.

Conductor
Ben-Dor was born in Montevideo, Uruguay, to Polish Jewish immigrant parents. She graduated from the Rubin Academy of Music, Tel Aviv University, and the Yale School of Music, also studying with Mendi Rodan in Jerusalem. She made her conducting debut with the Israel Philharmonic Orchestra in Stravinsky's "The Rite of Spring", televised and broadcast by the BBC/London throughout Europe and Israel. As an active guest conductor worldwide and American music director, Gisele Ben Dor has had a crucial role in the rejuvenation and promotion of the art music of Latin America, which she performs in concerts, festivals and recordings.
Ms. Ben-Dor's talent was recognized early by Leonard Bernstein, with whom she shared the stage at Tanglewood and at the Schleswig-Holstein Music Festivals. Since then, she served as the music director of the Santa Barbara Symphony Orchestra, the Boston Pro-Arte Chamber Orchestra and the Annapolis Symphony Orchestra, as well as Resident Conductor of the Houston Symphony and the Louisville Orchestra. She has led the New York Philharmonic, London Symphony Orchestra, Los Angeles Philharmonic, BBC National Orchestra of Wales, Helsinki Philharmonic, Minnesota Orchestra, Houston Symphony, Orchestre de la Suisse Romande, New World Symphony, Rotterdam Philharmonic, Seoul Philharmonic, Israel Philharmonic, Israel Chamber Orchestra, New Israeli Opera, Jerusalem Symphony Orchestra, additional orchestras in the Netherlands, several orchestras in France (Ille de France, Lille, Cannes, Montpelier, Metz, Picardy), Italy, Spain, Australia and South America amongst many others worldwide. Maestro Ben-Dor is currently Conductor Laureate of the Santa Barbara Symphony Orchestra and Conductor Emerita of the Boston Pro-Arte Chamber Orchestra, a post to which she was elected exclusively by the musicians and which she returns often as guest conductor. A winner of the Bártok Prize of Hungarian Television, Ms. Ben-Dor has also conducted several Eastern European orchestras in Hungary, Czechoslovakia, the former Yugoslavia, and Bulgaria.

Work with Latin American music
Uruguayan by birth and upbringing, Gisele Ben-Dor is a champion of Latin American music – notably the works of Ginastera, Villa-Lobos, Revueltas, Piazzolla, and Luis Bacalov – and is widely regarded as one of the world's finest and most dedicated exponents of this repertoire. Most recently her recording of world premieres by Piazzolla/Mosalini with Boston Pro-Arte Chamber Orchestra in a centenary tribute to Piazzolla ( ‘Cien Años” One Hundred Years) has garnered numerous top reviews ; earlier, Warner Classics released “The Vocal Album”, featuring music of Ginastera with Placido Domingo, Ana Maria Martinez and Virginia Tola. Working with Georgina Ginastera, the composer's daughter, she created the “Tango and Malambo Festival “a wide-ranging ten-day feast of concerts, dance, and film celebrating the urban and universally admired tango and the less familiar, rustic Malambo.

She also created the Revueltas Festival, showcasing every aspect of the Mexican composer’s music. Her major performances of Ginastera’s works include a new production and European premiere of his last opera, Beatrix Cenci ,at the Grand Théâtre de Genève, as well as Turbae ad Passionem Gregorianam in Madrid, also a European premiere. She has recorded several other CD’s of music of Latin American composers, all including world premiere recordings, and more are to be released, most notably a recording of Ginastera’s last opera, as well as another recording of Bartok’s music.

Posts
Conductor Laureate, Santa Barbara Symphony Orchestra, 2006–present
Music Director, Santa Barbara Symphony Orchestra, 1994–2006
Conductor Emerita, Boston Pro -Arte Chamber Orchestra, 2000–present
Music Director, Boston Pro -Arte Chamber Orchestra, 1991–2000
Artistic Advisor, World Piano Competition, Cincinnati, 1996, 1997, 2006, 2008, 2009
Music Director, Annapolis Symphony, 1991 – 97
New York Philharmonic Orchestra, Assistant to Music Director Kurt Masur, 1992–2002
Resident Conductor, Houston Symphony Orchestra, 1988 – 91, and Assistant Conductor to Music Director Christoph Eschenbach
Assistant Conductor, Louisville Orchestra ( Ky), 1987–88
Music Director, Norwalk Youth Symphony, Connecticut , 1984–87
Music Director, Institute "Ivria", Montevideo, Uruguay, 1969–1973

Recordings
Piazzolla and Mosalini “Cien Años”, “One Hundred Years”, with the Boston Pro-Arte Chamber Orchestra
Alberto Ginastera , Excerpts from the opera "Don Rodrigo" (world premiere), Cantata “Milena”, Five Popular Argentine Songs (orchestral version of Cinco Canciones Populares Argentinas, op.10, by Shimon Cohen, world premiere), Santa Barbara Symphony, with Plácido Domingo, Virginia Tola and Ana Maria Martinez (EMI, Paris)
Soul of Tango, world premiere works by Ástor Piazzolla and Luis Bacalov. Santa Barbara Symphony Orchestra, with Juanjo Mosalini, Virginia Tola and Luis Bacalov (Delos)
Alberto Ginastera, "Estancia" – complete ballet (world premiere), "Panambi" – complete ballet. London Symphony Orchestra, with Luis Gaeta. (Conifer)The album was a Grammy nominee, and has been reissued by Naxos.
Alberto Ginastera, “Glosses on Themes of Pablo Casals”, both full orchestra and string versions (world premiere) and “Variaciones Concertantes”. London Symphony Orchestra, Israel Chamber Orchestra (Koch International, reissued by Naxos)
Alberto Ginastera, "Ollantay", "Popol-Vuh", Suite of Native Dances (orchestral version of Suite de Danzas Criollas, op. 15, by Shimon Cohen, world premiere) and Suites from "Estancia" and "Panambi". BBC Orchestra of Wales, Jerusalem Symphony Orchestra, London Symphony Orchestra (Naxos) 
Silvestre Revueltas, "La Coronela" – ballet (world premiere), "Itinerarios", "Colorines", Santa Barbara Symphony Orchestra, English Chamber Orchestra (Koch International)
Béla Bartók, "For Children", Divertimento, Romanian Folk Dances. Sofia Soloists Chamber Orchestra (Centaur Records)
Ezra Sims, (CRI), Boston Pro-Arte Chamber Orchestra

Personal life
Born and raised in Uruguay to a family of  Polish Jewish immigrants, she studied at the Rubin Academy of Music in Tel-Aviv and at the Yale School of Music before residing in the United States. She became an American citizen in 2000.

References

 The Cambridge Companion to Conducting, Jose Antonio Bowen
 The Grove Dictionary of American Music, Second Edition, Charles Hiroshi Garrett
 The NPR (National Public Radi) Listener's Encyclopedia of Classical Music, Ted Libby
 Maestros in America, Roderick I Sharpe and Jeanne Koekkoek Sherman
 Classical Music, recording reviews, Alexander J. Morin
 The World of Women in Classical Music, Dr. Anne K. Gray
 Conducting her Destiny: The making of a maestra, Christina Williamson Elkins
 Emma Lou Diemer, a Bio-Bibliography, Ellen Grolman Schlegel
 Mastery: Interviews with 30 Remarkable People

External links
Official website "Gisèle Ben-Dor – Conductor" www.giseleben-dor.com
CultureBuzz Converses with Gisele Ben-Dor
Tango Festival 
The Revueltas Festival
Fanfare Magazine
Carnegie Corporation of New York Honors 34 Great Immigrants for Their Contributions to Our Democracy
Santa Barbara News-Press - Conductor wins immigrant award 
The Scooper, Israeli-American conductor Gisèle Ben Dor receives a special award 
Carnegie Corporation Honors Conductor Gisèle Ben-Dor 
GRAMOPHONE, review – Piazzolla: Cien Años  
the absolute sound, review - Piazzolla: Cien Años 
LATINJAZZNET, featured article - Piazzolla Cien Años: Lord of the Tango@100 
Planet Hugill, review - Piazzolla: Cien Años  
A marvelous Piazzolla centenary tribute  
A superb centenary tribute to the great tango master  
The Boston Musical Intelligencer, review - Pro Arte Tangos in the Cambridge Pampas  
Pro Arte Orchestra wraps season with a Largely Latin feast  
musical america WORLDWIDE, Press release: Cien Años: A Paean to Piazzolla and Tango from Conductor Gisèle Ben-Dor and Bandoneón Soloist Juanjo Mosalini  
AP News - Gisèle Ben-Dor y Juanjo Mosalini rinden homenaje a Piazzolla

Living people
1955 births
American people of Polish-Jewish descent
American people of Uruguayan descent
American people of Uruguayan-Jewish descent
Israeli Jews
Israeli people of Uruguayan-Jewish descent
Uruguayan emigrants to Israel
Uruguayan Jews
Uruguayan people of Polish-Jewish descent
Women conductors (music)
20th-century American conductors (music)
21st-century American conductors (music)
Centaur Records artists
Jewish American musicians